Joe Trotter (born September 23, 1963 in Cedar Falls, Iowa) is an American actor.

Joe was discovered by John Frankenheimer for the cast of Andersonville (1996), a TNT 4-hour miniseries, as a northern sergeant in a southern prison of war camp.

After Andersonville, Joe went to work for Aaron Spelling, on the WB network television show, Savannah. Joe worked on the pilot and the first season.

Joe is currently working on two screen plays that he is going to produce, direct and act in and a stand-up comedy act.

Joe is also an inventor and has patented a new type of shower curtain "ShowerSail" The new invention has solved this issues of blow-in with an added bonus of giving bather more room also "ShowerSail" a product of Spinnaker Bath Products.

Acting credits
 Dead by Dawn 2: The Mask of Conrad (2004) (V)
 Andersonville (1996) (TV)
 Liquid Stage: The Lure of Surfing (1996) (TV)
 "Savannah" drama WB network (1996) (TV)

External links
 
 Famous like me article

Male actors from Iowa
Living people
People from Cedar Falls, Iowa
1963 births